The Temple of My Familiar is a 1989 novel by Alice Walker. It is an ambitious and multi-narrative novel containing the interleaved stories of Arveyda, a musician in search of his past; Carlotta, his Latin American wife who lives in exile from hers; Suwelo, a black professor of American History who realizes that his generation of men have failed women; Fanny, his ex-wife about to meet her father for the first time; and Lissie, a vibrant creature with a thousand pasts.

References

External links
 (excerpt)

1989 American novels
Novels by Alice Walker
Womanist novels
African-American novels